Euseius ovalis is a species of mite in the family Phytoseiidae.

References

ovalis
Articles created by Qbugbot
Animals described in 1953